The list of ship launches in 1666 includes a chronological list of some ships launched in 1666.

References

1666
Ship launches